Freedom from Hunger (established in 1946, and now part of the Grameen Foundation) is an international development organization working in nineteen different countries. Rather than provide food aid, Freedom from Hunger focuses on providing small loans and business education to poor women. It is a nonprofit, nongovernmental, nonsectarian organization classified by the IRS as a 501(c)(3) charity. It was evaluated in 2011 by GiveWell who found their programs had little to no lasting impact.

History
First known as Meals for Millions, the organization that developed and introduced Multi-Purpose Food, a high-protein powdered food supplement is used today in relief efforts around the world. In the 1970s, Freedom from Hunger began implementing Applied Nutrition Programs, focusing on the health and nutrition of mothers and children. In 1988, Freedom from Hunger developed the world's first integrated microcredit health and nutrition education program. As of December 2009, 1,304,802 women were participating in Credit with Education in 15 countries. This number has more than tripled since 2005.

Application of microcredit
In comparison to institution-building microfinance organizations that only provide financial services, Freedom From Hunger supplements its financial services with education and health initiatives designed to improve living standards for the poor. In addition, Freedom From Hunger concentrates on serving the poor in the most rural areas.

Programs

Credit with education
Freedom from Hunger works with local partners to offer microcredit loans to poor women in rural areas. The loans, which can vary from as little as $5 to as much as $400, allow the women to become entrepreneurs who run home-based businesses such as making food products or crafts to sell. The key difference between Credit with Education and similar programs is the emphasis on providing education to the women at their weekly meetings. The women learn about health, nutrition, hygiene, family planning and sound business practices. In combination with their additional business income, the women act on this knowledge and begin to break the cycle of chronic hunger and poverty. Providing access to these resources in a single integrated program simultaneously teaches women how to help her children and earn the money they need to act on their knowledge.

Saving for Change
Saving for Change is a low cost and highly replicable methodology for self-managed saving and lending groups that bring basic financial services to areas that are typically beyond the reach of microfinance institutions. Saving for Change helps the very poor to better manage their money, by building useful lump sums for predictable needs through regular saving, with the opportunity to take out loans when they need them.  The self-managed groups are extremely adaptable and responsive to member needs. Saving for Change creates sustainable, cohesive groups that tackle financial and social issues facing their members and their communities. Program growth is accelerated by the initiative of replicators—group members who in turn form other savings groups in their communities.  With special training and support provided by field agents, replicators greatly expand the number of Saving for Change groups at comparable quality.

Malaria initiative
Freedom From Hunger's Malaria Initiative is sponsored by a grant from GlaxoSmithKline's African Malaria Partnership program. The project focuses on the development and manufacture of anti-malarial drugs, the pursuit of an effective malaria vaccine, and initiatives to build the capacity of poor communities to fight the disease directly. When including the costs of health care, lost productivity, and decreased tourism, malaria costs African countries an aggregate of over $12 billion per year. Malaria often eats up more than 40% of all public health expenditures.

The malaria initiative includes three components. The first component teaches women about how malaria is transmitted, how to recognize the early symptoms of malaria, and how to properly prepare doses of anti-malarial drugs for their children. Because many of the women that Freedom From Hunger works with are illiterate, the educational component is presented through alternative mediums such as role play, story, or song.

The second component is the subsidized distribution of insecticide-treated bednets. Through partnership with local manufacturers and distributors, women can buy the bednets for a highly subsidized price of approximately $4 per net. The program has been highly successful in encouraging the purchase and daily use of bednets and has been shown to demonstrably reduce the incidence rate of malaria. Freedom from Hunger has also secured access to local stores of anti-malarial drugs which can be purchased directly.

The final component of the malaria initiative is intended to ensure the sustainability of the program. Freedom from Hunger has trained local organizations to implement the malaria initiative as part of the Credit with Education program. As a result, the cost of the program is covered by interest payments on microfinance loans.

Every year, Freedom from Hunger takes part in World Malaria Day. For this international day of awareness, Freedom from Hunger builds a devoted microsite.

Microfinance and Health Protection Initiative
Freedom from Hunger launched the Microfinance and Health Protection (MAHP) initiative in 2006 to help their local partners create and sustain key health protection services that complement their credit services and help credit clients safeguard their families' health. Made possible through funding by the Bill & Melinda Gates Foundation, this innovative program not only protects the household incomes of poor families (the cost of paying for treatment can be a major setback for very poor families), it also improves their ability to repay loans on time.

Another important benefit is the improved sustainability of the local organization providing microfinance services to very poor communities. Their ability to sustain and grow their operations is directly linked to the health of their clients.

MAHP is an innovation on Freedom from Hunger's proven Credit with Education program. Credit with Education combines credit and savings services with education on health topics of vital interest to poor communities. Women who participate in Credit with Education programs come together every week or two to borrow money or repay loans. At these same meetings, women participate in learning sessions on topics such as breastfeeding, child health and nutrition, family planning, women's health and business training.

Credit with Education is one of the few microfinance programs proven to have statistically beneficial impacts on child health and nutrition.

MAHP takes Credit with Education a step further by adding new services such as:
 health savings plans to help women cover the cost of seeking medical care for their families
 low-cost health products to support women's use of proven preventions such as insecticide-treated bednets and water purification systems
 group rates at approved health clinics and hospitals to encourage women's use of vital services such as prenatal care, HIV/AIDS testing and family planning
 micro-insurance that allows women to pay a small, fixed fee in advance of health services they and their families need
 health loans to give women immediate financial support when their families face an emergency (eliminating their need for high-interest moneylenders who keep them in debt for months or even years)

MAHP partners are trained by Freedom from Hunger to provide these services sustainably and to extend special outreach to rural areas where communities are more vulnerable to illness because of increased exposure and few health care options.

Freedom from Hunger is partnering with five microfinance institutions to develop and test MAHP innovations: Bandhan in India, CARD in the Philippines, CRECER in Bolivia, PADME in Benin and RCPB in Burkina Faso. As MAHP demonstrates impact, Freedom from Hunger will bring its successful services to many more countries and organizations.

Freedom from Hunger Day

In October 2006, The Yolo County Board of Supervisors proclaimed September 28 to be Freedom from Hunger Day "in recognition of Freedom from Hunger's 60 years of success in fighting hunger with self-help programs that achieve a lasting end to hunger while promoting the dignity of women and families living in poverty." The date was also declared an official day of awareness by the State of California.

External reviews

GiveWell review 
In May 2011, charity evaluator GiveWell published a review of Freedom from Hunger. Their overall conclusion was that "Freedom from Hunger does not currently qualify for our highest ratings", due to their outsourcing of programs, and the little to no long term impacts they had. They praised Freedom from Hunger on many counts, including the observation that "Freedom from Hunger has a commendable focus on evaluation that is extremely rare among charities. It has been involved in highly rigorous evaluations of its programs, and it publishes numerous technical reports about its work on its websites." The review page also features a response from the charity to the review.

See also

 Bread for the World – Nationwide Christian citizens movement seeking justice for the world's hungry people by lobbying.
 Empty Bowls – A project where participants create ceramic bowls, then serve a simple meal of soup and bread. In exchange for a meal and the bowl, the guest gives a suggested minimum donation of ten dollars. The meal sponsors and/or guests choose a hunger-fighting organization to receive the money collected.
 Food First – A member-supported, nonprofit 'peoples' think tank and education-for-action center. Their work highlights root causes and value-based solutions to hunger and poverty around the world.
 World Bank PovertyNet – The PovertyNet site is maintained by the Poverty Reduction Group, part of the Poverty Reduction and Economic Management Network at the World Bank. The site provides resources and support for people working to understand and alleviate hunger.
 World Food Programme – WFP works to put hunger at the centre of the international agenda, promoting policies, strategies and operations that directly benefit the poor and hungry.
 World Hunger Relief – Provided for a program in agroforestry and related technologies to address the needs of the hungry, both foreign and domestic.

References

External links
 Freedom from Hunger official website
 Catalyst Newsletter published by Freedom from Hunger

Development charities based in the United States
Hunger relief organizations
International sustainability organizations
Microfinance organizations
Charities based in California
Davis, California
Organizations established in 1946
1946 establishments in California